Padma Chavan was an Indian actress who appeared in Hindi films, television and theatres.

Filmography

Films
 Avaghachi Sansar (1960)
 Bin Badal Barsaat (1961)
 Stree (1961)
 Suhag Sindoor (1961)
 Kashmir Ki Kali  (1964)
 Flying Man (1965)
 Daku Mangal Singh (1966)
 Nagin Aur Sapera  (1966)
 Jyotibacha Navas  (1975)
 Bot Lavin Tithe Gudgulya  (1978)
 Aaram Haram Aahe  (1976)
 Tuch Majhi Rani (1977)
 Karva Chouth (1978)
 Dost Asava Tar Asa (1978)
 Javayachi Jaat (1979)
 Ashtvinayak (1979)
 Karva Chouth (1980)
 Naram Garam (1981)
 Khoon Ki Takkar (1981)
 Ashanti (1982)
 Dulha Bikta Hai (1982)
 Angoor (1982)
 Jeevan Dhara (1982)
 Navare Sagale Gadhav (1982)
 Gupchup Gupchup (1983)
 Sadma (1983)
 Jeet Hamari (1983)
 Premasathi Vattel Te   (1987)
 Woh Phir Aayegi (1988)
 Hamara Khandaan (1988)

Play and role
 Lagnachi Bedi (Rashmi)
 Mazi Bayko Mazi Mevhani (Rasika)
 Navryachi Dhamal Tar Baykochi Kamal (Sunita)
 Sakhi Shejarini (Preeti)
 Biwi Kari Salaam (Rama)
 Mavali (Alaknanda)
 Guntata Hruday He (Kalyani)
 Vaje Paul Aapule (Sushila)
 Lafada Sadan (Sandika)
 Pijara (Aai)
 Baykola Jevha Jaag Yete (Avantika)
 Mhanun Mi Tula Kuthe Net Nahi'' (Satyabhama)

See also
Marathi cinema

References

External links

1996 deaths
Marathi actors
Actresses in Marathi cinema
Actresses from Mumbai
20th-century Indian actresses
1948 births
Indian stage actresses